Wainwright is an unincorporated community located in Monroe County, Alabama, United States, approximately 100 miles northeast of Mobile and 100 miles southwest of Montgomery.

References

Unincorporated communities in Monroe County, Alabama
Unincorporated communities in Alabama